Kaps is a village in the Akhuryan Municipality of the Shirak Province of Armenia. There were 1088 inhabitants in 2008.

Demographics

References 

Populated places in Shirak Province